Wu Xiuquan (March 1908 – 9 November 1997) was a Chinese Communist revolutionary, military officer, and diplomat. He studied in the Soviet Union, enlisted in the Chinese Red Army, and participated in the Long March. After the founding of the People's Republic of China, he served as Vice Minister of Foreign Affairs, China's first ambassador to Yugoslavia, and Vice Minister of the International Liaison Department of the Communist Party of China. After being imprisoned for eight years during the Cultural Revolution, Wu was appointed Deputy Chief of the People's Liberation Army General Staff Department in 1975 and later served as vice president of the special court that tried and convicted the Gang of Four and the Lin Biao clique of numerous crimes during the Cultural Revolution.

Early life and education 
Wu was born in March 1908 in Wuchang, Hubei, toward the end of the Qing dynasty, with his ancestral home in Yangxin County. While studying at Wuhan Middle School, he was active in the student movement and became a member of the Socialist Youth League of China under the influence of Chen Tanqiu and Dong Biwu.

In October 1925, he was sent to the Soviet Union to study international politics at Moscow Sun Yat-sen University. After the 1927 Shanghai massacre, the Communist Party of China established its own military force, and Wu transferred to Moscow Infantry School to receive military training. He worked in the Russian Far East after 1929.

Wartime career 
Wu returned to China in May 1931, when the Communist movement was at its nadir. He enlisted in the Red Army and participated in the Long March. At the crucial Zunyi Conference in 1935, Wu served as the interpreter for the Comintern advisor Otto Braun (Li De), but opposed Braun and supported Mao Zedong's strategy, unlike other returnees from the Soviet Union who supported Comintern's orthodox line.

During the Second Sino-Japanese War, Wu was appointed head of the Eighth Route Army's Lanzhou office, which he developed into a hub for receiving and transporting military aid from the Soviet Union for China's war effort. After the surrender of Japan at the end the war, Wu was appointed Chief of Staff of the People's Liberation Army (PLA) in the formerly Japanese-occupied Northeast China. He became Chairman of the Shenyang Military Control Commission after the PLA seized the city in November 1948, and a member of the Northeast People's Government when it was founded in August 1949.

Early People's Republic of China 

When the People's Republic of China was founded in October 1949, Wu was appointed head of the Soviet Union and Eastern Europe Department of the Foreign Ministry and accompanied Mao Zedong on his visit to the Soviet Union in January 1950. In November 1950, Wu attended a United Nations Security Council meeting as the PRC representative. He made a long speech condemning the United States for its "armed aggression" in Taiwan and "armed intervention" in the Korean War, and called for the UN to demand the withdrawal of U.S. forces from both Taiwan and Korea.

In 1951, Wu was promoted to Vice Foreign Minister of the PRC. In March 1953, he visited Moscow again, as a member of the Chinese delegation led by Premier Zhou Enlai, to attend the funeral of Joseph Stalin.

In September 1954, Wu was elected a member of the Sichuan delegation to the 1st National People's Congress. In March 1955, he was appointed the PRC's first ambassador to Yugoslavia. He was elected a member of the 8th Central Committee of the Communist Party of China in 1956. In 1958, he attended the Seventh Congress of Yugoslavian Communist Party, after which Sino-Yugoslavian relations almost broke because China harshly criticized Yugoslavia for its disobedience against Soviet Union. From October 1958 to April 1967, he served as Vice Minister of the International Liaison Department of the CPC. In December 1962 and January 1963, Wu visited Bulgaria, Hungary, Czechoslovakia and East Germany to attend each country's party congresses, the last of which attended by Khrushchev. Wu exchanged fierce remarks with local Communists and meanwhile, the Sino-Soviet dispute worsened.

Cultural Revolution and aftermath 
During the Cultural Revolution, Wu resisted Kang Sheng's attempt to persecute the senior leader Wang Jiaxiang. On 8 April 1967, after he posted a big-character poster condemning the chaos created by the radicals at the International Liaison Department, Kang Sheng and Lin Biao arrested Wu as a foreign spy and imprisoned him for eight years.

In April 1975, Marshal Ye Jianying worked to rehabilitate Wu and appointed him Deputy Chief of the PLA General Staff Department. After the end of the Cultural Revolution, Wu was appointed vice president of the special court for the trials of the Gang of Four and the Lin Biao clique. He presided over 16 trials and participated in 14 others. He was elected a member of the 11th Central Committee and a standing committee member of the 12th and 13th Central Advisory Commission. He was also a member of the Standing Committee of the National People's Congress and the Chinese People's Political Consultative Conference.

Wu published several memoirs, including My Life's Journey, Reminiscences of Wu Xiuquan, and Eight Years in the Ministry of Foreign Affairs.

On 9 November 1997, Wu died in Beijing at the age of 89.

Family
Wu had four daughters and a son with his first wife. After her death, Wu married Xu He in 1948 in Dalian, and she gave birth to another daughter. Xu He was the third of five children of the educator Xu Yibing. Xu Chi, a renowned writer, and Xu Shunshou, a founder of China's aircraft manufacturing industry, were Wu's brothers-in-law.

References 

1908 births
1997 deaths
Ambassadors of China to Yugoslavia
Chinese autobiographers
Chinese expatriates in the Soviet Union
Delegates to the 7th National Congress of the Chinese Communist Party
Delegates to the 1st National People's Congress
Eighth Route Army personnel
Members of the 8th Central Committee of the Chinese Communist Party
Members of the 11th Central Committee of the Chinese Communist Party
Members of the Central Advisory Commission
Moscow Sun Yat-sen University alumni
People's Republic of China politicians from Hubei
Politicians from Wuhan
Victims of the Cultural Revolution
Writers from Wuhan